Vegas Tycoon (also styled Vega$: Make It B!G) is a business simulation game for Windows that was released October 14 2003 in Europe and January 19, 2004 in North America.

Gameplay 
The player is tasked with building and maintaining a Las Vegas resort with hotels and casinos while keeping guests entertained.

Reception 

The game has received mainly positive reviews with IGN calling it "a pretty fun and complex tycoon experience."

References

External Links 
Page at Deep Red games

2003 video games
Business simulation games
Video games developed in the United Kingdom
Windows games
Windows-only games
Video games set in the Las Vegas Valley
Lua (programming language)-scripted video games
Casino video games
Video games set in Nevada
Global Star Software games
Single-player video games
DR Studios games